Peadar Clohessy (19 December 1933 – 18 January 2014) was an Irish politician from Fedamore, County Limerick. He was a Teachta Dála (TD) for the Limerick East constituency from 1981 to 1982 and from 1987 to 1997.

A farmer, Clohessy was first elected as a Fianna Fáil TD in the 1981 general election on his third attempt. He lost his seat at the February 1982 election, and did not contest the November 1982 election. He joined the Progressive Democrats as a founding member, and was one of 14 TDs elected at the 1987 general election, the first election after the party was founded. He retained his seat until retiring at the 1997 general election. He was Chief Whip of the Progressive Democrats and Assistant Government Whip from 1989 to 1992.

In 1979 he was elected to Limerick County Council, where he served for 25 years, and was chairman of the council in 1992.

Clohessy died on 18 January 2014.

References

1933 births
2014 deaths
Progressive Democrats TDs
Fianna Fáil TDs
Members of the 22nd Dáil
Members of the 25th Dáil
Local councillors in County Limerick
Members of the 26th Dáil
Members of the 27th Dáil
Irish farmers